Mosè Turri (1837 -1903) was an Italian painter.

He was born and was a resident in Milan. He painted mainly animals and still-lives of fruits and flowers. In 1881, he exhibited at Milan: Una sorpresa ; Animali; Natura morta; in 1884 in Turin: Fiori, and Selvaggina.

References

1837 births
1903 deaths
19th-century Italian painters
Italian male painters
20th-century Italian painters
20th-century Italian male artists
Painters from Milan
Italian painters of animals
Italian still life painters
19th-century Italian male artists